The Suárez Fault is a sinistral oblique thrust fault in the department of Santander in northeastern Colombia.

Etymology 
The fault is named after the Suárez River.

Description 
The Suárez Fault runs from Barbosa in the south, where it displaces the Simití Formation, and joins the Bucaramanga Fault a few kilometers to the north of the city of Bucaramanga. The Suárez Fault cuts Jurassic (Girón Formation), and Cretaceous sedimentary rocks (Simití, Rosablanca and Paja Formations), and Quaternary alluvial deposits and mud flows that form the "Bucaramanga Terrace". The trace of the fault is well defined, controls linear drainages such as the Suárez River for several kilometers, has sag ponds, and locally dams alluvium. The fault vertically offsets debris flows in the area of Girón and La Fuente and displaces a Tertiary erosion surface.

See also 

 List of earthquakes in Colombia
 Cimitarra Fault

References

Bibliography

Maps

Further reading 
 

Seismic faults of Colombia
Thrust faults
Strike-slip faults
Inactive faults
Faults